Phyllonorycter albertinus is a moth of the family Gracillariidae. It is found in the Albertine Rift in Kenya in savannah areas with intermixed secondary vegetation.

The length of the forewings is 3.27–3.36 mm. The forewings are greyish ochreous with white markings. The hindwings are dark beige with fuscous shading and a long greyish fringe. Adults are on wing from mid-January to early February.

Etymology
The name refers to the Albertine Rift Valley, the area of occurrence.

References

Endemic moths of Kenya
Moths described in 2012
albertinus
Moths of Africa

Taxa named by Jurate de Prins